Santa Rosa Route 66 Airport  is a public use airport located three nautical miles (6 km) east of the central business district of Santa Rosa, a town in Guadalupe County, New Mexico, United States. It is owned by the Town of Santa Rosa.

Although most U.S. airports use the same three-letter location identifier for the FAA and IATA, this airport is assigned SXU by the FAA but has no designation from the IATA (which assigned SXU to Soddu, Ethiopia).

Facilities and aircraft 
It has two asphalt paved runways: 1/19 is 5,013 by 75 feet (1,528 x 23 m) and 8/26 is 4,294 by 60 feet (1,309 x 18 m). For the 12-month period ending April 9, 2008, the airport had 2,130 aircraft operations, an average of 177 per month: 94% general aviation and 6% air taxi.

References

External links 
 

Airports in New Mexico
Transportation in Guadalupe County, New Mexico
Buildings and structures in Guadalupe County, New Mexico
Santa Rosa, New Mexico